Gueguen is a French surname. Notable people with the surname include:

Frédéric Gueguen (born 1970), French footballer
Michel Gueguen (born 1951), French modern pentathlete
Raoul Gueguen (born 1947), French modern pentathlete

See also
Mount Guéguen, a mountain of Antarctica
Guéguen Point, a headland of Antarctica

French-language surnames